David Stein (born Henri Haddad, January 27, 1935, Alexandria, Egypt – October 1999, Bordeaux, France) was an artist who, until 1966, had been frequently sentenced for theft by the French courts before becoming an art forger and art dealer with 15 aliases.

Biography
Stein often copied paintings in the style of the masters. For example, he studied Marc Chagall, Matisse, Braque, Paul Klee, Miró, Jean Cocteau and Rouault, in order to copy their color scheme and inspirations. His clients were mainly attracted by his low prices

In 1967 Marc Chagall notified authorities of forgeries of his work hanging in a New York gallery, and Stein was arrested. Art dealers refused to cooperate with the prosecution because it would have incriminated them and made their expertise in the art field questionable. Some art collectors refused to give up their paintings as evidence. Stein was convicted of six counts of art forgery and grand larceny. During his prison term, Joseph Stone, the judge who arrested him, brought him to his office to paint. He remained a good friend of the Stein family long after Stein completed his jail sentence. In 1989 he discovered that Stein never stopped making forgeries.

After Stein had served his prison term in the United States, he was deported to France where he served another term. Prison authorities allowed him to make further paintings, although now using his own name. In 1969 a London gallery sold some of these paintings. After Stein was released, he returned to painting, this time selling his paintings under his own name to put a mask on his real activities.

The book Three Picassos Before Breakfast (Mémoirs of an Art Forger's Wife) by Anne Marie Stein as told to Georges Carpozi Jr (Hawthorn Book Inc) was written by David's life partner Anne-Marie about their experiences in the art world. In the mid 1980s director Gil Cates gave his agent Arthur Axelman at William Morris a copy of the book which had been written without Stein's involvement. Axelman set out to find Stein and after several years he located him in Manhattan. Stein became an Axelman client and friend. While deals at HBO and ABC did not lead to production of a film, Axelman introduced Stein to Keith Carradine and Alan Rudolph, director of the movie "The Moderns" with ultimately starred John Lone, Géraldine Chaplin, Keith Carradine and Linda Fiorentino. The film was set in the Paris of the '20s although filmed in Montreal. Stein appeared in the film as an art critic and provided all of the art. A minor concern was a scene where a painting in the style of Matisse and Modigliani was to be burned on camera and a Modigliani destroyed by knife. No one cared to destroy any of Stein's copies, "Just good for the camera" say Stein. but a William Morris assistant for agent Axelman suggested making large format copies of the works to be destroyed. Stein refused and during the scene actor John Lone destroyed the Paintings.

Stein was living in France after his troubles with the US immigration who had told him to leave US territory in 1988. He met the French photo-reporter Stéphane Korb in 1981 in New York and they became close friends. During 10 years, with an agreement of David Stein, he was witness and confidant to his activities and has the most important photo archives and files about the personal life and activities of Stein since 1981, including the story of the fake collages of Superman comics signed "Andy Warhol 1960".

David Stein tried to escape a number of creditors after making in New York and in Paris a large series of collages of Superman signed "Andy Warhol 1960". According to The New York Times in 1989 two comics experts discovered a series of fake collages in the Andy Warhol retrospective in the MOMA. The same event happen in Paris 3 years later. With the complicity of a French movie producer, Stein put 4 fake Superman collages in a public auction according to the French weekly magazine VSD.

David Stein died in October 1999 in Bordeaux, France, from cancer. He had three children.

Further reading 
 Anne-Marie Stein: Three Picassos Before Breakfast. Memoirs of an Art Forger's Wife, Hawthorn Books New York 1973
 John E. Cronkin: Art Fraud, New York 1994, particularly pp. 73ff

References

External links 
 From a French TV program about Stein
 Short account with photograph
 The Fälschermuseum in Wien
KORB-ART

Art forgers
1999 deaths
1935 births